Bloemendhal Grama Niladhari Division is a Grama Niladhari Division of the Colombo Divisional Secretariat of Colombo District of Western Province, Sri Lanka.

Sugathadasa Stadium, Bloemendhal, St. Benedict's College, Colombo, St. Lucia's College, Colombo, St. Lucia's Cathedral, Roman Catholic Archdiocese of Colombo, Sojitz Kelanitissa Power Station, Grandpass and Colombo Port Power Station are located within, nearby or associated with Bloemendhal.

Bloemendhal is a surrounded by the Mahawatta, Wadulla, New Bazaar, Grandpass South, Aluthmawatha, Grandpass North, Kotahena East and Lunupokuna Grama Niladhari Divisions.

Demographics

Ethnicity 

The Bloemendhal Grama Niladhari Division has a Sri Lankan Tamil plurality (47.1%), a significant Sinhalese population (33.6%) and a significant Moor population (15.0%). In comparison, the Colombo Divisional Secretariat (which contains the Bloemendhal Grama Niladhari Division) has a Moor plurality (40.1%), a significant Sri Lankan Tamil population (31.1%) and a significant Sinhalese population (25.0%)

Religion 

The Bloemendhal Grama Niladhari Division has a Hindu plurality (29.1%), a significant Buddhist population (26.0%), a significant Roman Catholic population (22.6%) and a significant Muslim population (16.0%). In comparison, the Colombo Divisional Secretariat (which contains the Bloemendhal Grama Niladhari Division) has a Muslim plurality (41.8%), a significant Hindu population (22.7%), a significant Buddhist population (19.0%) and a significant Roman Catholic population (13.1%)

Gallery

References 

Grama Niladhari Divisions of Colombo Divisional Secretariat